Christophe Godin (born 1968) is a French guitarist and singer, known for his work with the French bands Metal Kartoon, Gnô and Mörglbl. Godin plays a variety of styles, including heavy metal, jazz fusion, blues and more.

Biography 

Christophe Godin was born in Annecy, France.  He has toured with some famous musicians, like Ron "Bumblefoot" Thal (Guns N' Roses), Andy Timmons (Danger Danger), Mattias Eklundh (Freak Kitchen), Kiko Loureiro (Angra, Megadeth), Guthrie Govan, etc. Mörglbl shared the stage with Liquid Tension Experiment (3/5 of Dream Theater plus Tony Levin on bass) at US biggest indoor prog festival, NEARfest in 2008 for the festival's 10th anniversary. He also played with Paul Gilbert (Mr. Big), Frank Gambale (Chick Corea), Jennifer Batten (Michael Jackson).

Godin is known for his sense of humour, virtuosic guitar skills, energetic performances and overall wacky personality. (These traits can be best observed in one of his live performances, where he does both the vocals and guitar parts in the Jimi Hendrix classic "Little Wing". Instead of playing the chords as they would normally be played, Godin played the arpeggiated versions of those chords using the sweep picking technique, all the while singing in time with his playing.) He is a world class in demand clinician, and tours and teaches all over the globe. 
His style combines all aspects of modern guitar and steps into all genres, from metal to jazz. Though famous for his virtuosity and improvisational skills, he is an accomplished rhythm guitarist and a respected composer and arranger.

Christophe Godin began his musical journey as a local guitar hero in several bands which, unfortunately, never left any trace.

In 1995, with Temple, Christophe played on an album that was properly distributed in France and received a wave of positive reviews.

In 1996, he took part on Guitare Attitudes, a compilation featuring French guitarists, that allowed him to regularly appear on the French TV show Nulle Part Ailleurs (Canal +) as a guest guitarist.

In 1997, he created, along with Ivan Rougny and Jean-Pierre Frelézeau, the Mörglbl Trio !! and released two albums ("The Mörglbl Trio !!" in 1998 and "Bienvenue à Mörglbl Land" in 1999). With this band, the doors to international distribution finally opened. In the meantime, Christophe, who's been a teacher at the E.T.M. of Geneva, Switzerland, since 1994, acquired a solid reputation as a guitar instructor with the release of an instructional video (Heavy metal : les techniques) and the multitude of articles he wrote for dozens of guitar magazines in France, Germany and the UK. He became a regular guest at the prestigious M.A.I. of Nancy in France, and runs master-classes everywhere on the planet.

In 2001, he created Gnô, with Gabriel Vegh (bass/vocals) and Peter Puke (drums/vocals), and released "Trash Deluxe". Gnô was on tour intensively throughout France until 2003. Finally, simultaneously with his duo with Pierrejean Gaucher (the 2G, playing Frank Zappa covers alongside their original material), Christophe, released his solo project named Christophe Godin's Metal Kartoon, where all the ingredients that made the career of the guitarist what it is are to be found on this record: humour, virtuosity, and a mix of jazz, funk and metal.

Now simply named "Morglbl", the band released their sixth album Tea Time For Pünks on 26 May 2015. Christophe has toured intensively with the band all over the world including è US Tours, one China Tour, and performances all over the world.
In 2018, the band releases their last album entitled "The Störy of Scott Rötti".
In 2020, Christophe Godin starts a new project with belgian singer extraordinaire Maggy Luyten, also feat Ivan Rougny and Aurel Ouzoulias. The band begins touring in 2021, and their first album "The Prize" is released in 2022. 

Christophe also performs with guitarist extraordinaire Oliver-Roman Garcia in an impressive acoustic guitar duo extravaganza !

Godin was voted fifth best international guitarist by Guitar Part magazine.

Christophe is an official international ambassador and tours worldwide for the following companies :
Laney amps (UK), Vigier guitars (France), Savarez Strings (France), Right on Straps (Spain), Cole Clark acoustic guitars (Australia), Zoom effects (Japan), Palmer effects (Germany), Gruv Gear (US).

Discography 

Temple
 Temple (1995)

Mörglbl
 The Mörglbl Trio!! (1998)
 Bienvenue à Mörglbl Land (1999)
 Grötesk (2007)
 Toon Tunes from the Past (2008)
 Jäzz for the Deaf (2009)
 Brütal Römance (2012)
 Tea Time For Pünks (2015)
 The Story of Scott Rötti (2019)

The Prize
The Prize (2022)

Wax'In
 Wax'In (2016)

Gnô 
 Trash Deluxe (2001)
 Cannibal Tango (2011)
 Crass Palace (2013)

Christophe Godin
 Christophe Godin's Metal Kartoon (2005)

Collaborations / Duos
 Christophe Chambert - The Family (1999)
 Rob Van Der Loo's Freak Neils Inc. (2004)
 2G - Pierrejean Gaucher / Christophe Godin (2007)
 Samuel Arkan's Origins (2010)
 Christophe Godin & Olivier-Roman Garcia (2014)

Compilations
 Guitare attitudes rock influences (1996)
 Pour une Terre sans mines (1998)

Equipment 

Christophe Godin endorses Vigier electric guitars and Cole Clark acoustic guitars, Laney amps, Zoom effects, Palmer effect and guitar solutions, Gruv Gear guitar wraps and Savarez strings.

Electric guitars

 Vigier Christophe Godin Signature
 Vigier Excalibur Orangette
 Vigier Excalibur Supra Kartoonette
 Vigier Excalibur Custom
 Vigier Excalibur Expert
 2 Vigier Supra 7 strings
 4 GV Vigier Guitars
 Vigier Surfreter
 1 Fender The Strat
Pickups
4SeasonsPickups Christophe Godin seigneur model

Acoustic guitars

 Cole Clark AN2EC-CR
 Lakewood 
 Mala Ukulele

Amps

 Laney IRT SLS
 Laney Ironheart Studio
 Laney GH50L
 Laney GH100L
 Laney VH100R
 Laney TT100
 Laney TFX 100
 Laney VC 50
 Laney Lionheart
 Laney Ironheart
 Laney VC15
 Laney LA65C
 Laney 4 x 12 Cabinets
 Laney 2 x 12 Cabinet
 Palmer 2 x 12
 Palmer The Junction
 Palmer ADIG-LB

Effects

 Zoom G11
 Zoom CDR70
 Laney Secret Path
 Ernie Ball delay and volume pedals
 Custom Audio wha

References

External links 
 Christophe Godin Official Site - Biography
 Christophe Godin Official Site - Equipment
 http://www.gno-music.com/
 Zoom
 Christophe Godin Vigier Excalibur anniversary guitar

1966 births
Living people
People from Annecy
French rock guitarists
French male guitarists